Ulyanovka is a rural locality (a khutor) in Volokonovsky District, Belgorod Oblast, Russia. The population was 66 as of 2010. There are 2 streets.

Geography 
Ulyanovka is located 14 km south of Volokonovka (the district's administrative centre) by road. Vetchininovo is the nearest rural locality.

References 

Rural localities in Volokonovsky District